The Andean tapaculo (Scytalopus magellanicus) was a species of South American bird belonging to the tapaculo group. It has now been split into several species, three of which are sometimes known as Andean tapaculo: 

Magellanic tapaculo, Scytalopus magellanicus
Puna tapaculo, Scytalopus simonsi
Pale-bellied tapaculo, Scytalopus griseicollis

Birds by common name